Holthuisana is a genus of crabs belonging to the family Gecarcinucidae.

The species of this genus are found in Australia.

Species:

Holthuisana alba 
Holthuisana beauforti 
Holthuisana biroi 
Holthuisana boesemani 
Holthuisana briggsi 
Holthuisana festiva 
Holthuisana lipkei 
Holthuisana loriae 
Holthuisana subconvexa 
Holthuisana tikus 
Holthuisana vanheurni 
Holthuisana wollastoni

References

Gecarcinucidae